The Vikings at Helgeland (Hærmændene paa Helgeland) is Henrik Ibsen's seventh play. It was written during 1857 and first performed at Christiania Norske Theater in Oslo on 24 November 1858. The plot takes place during the time of Erik Blood-axe (c. 930–934) in the north of Norway in historic Helgeland, a time in which Norwegian society was adjusting from the tradition of Old Norse Sagas to the new era of Christianity. It concerns the arrival of Ornulf, who with his seven sons is seeking his daughter, Dagny, and foster-daughter, Hjordis, who were abducted and married by Sigurd and Gunnar, respectively. Tragedy compounded by conceptions of honour and duty lead to the deaths of all of Ornulf's sons, Sigurd (who is killed by Hjordis), and Hjordis (by suicide). The plot is reminiscent of the Germanic myth of Sigmund and Brynhilde.

Main characters 
 Sigurd the Strong, Sea-King
 Gunnar, rich farmer of Helgeland
 Ørnulf, Icelandic Chieftain
 Hjørdis, Ørnulf's foster daughter
 Dagny, Ørnulf's daughter
 Egil, Gunnar's and Hjørdis' four-year-old son
 Kåre, Helgeland peasant

Translations
This play was translated into English by Scottish writer and critic William Archer as a part of his publication Henrik Ibsen's Prose Dramas Vol. III. This volume consisted of Lady Inger of Östrat (Fru Inger til Østeraad); The Vikings at Helgeland (Hærmændene paa Helgeland); and The Pretenders (Kongs-Emnerne). It was published by The Walter Scott Company, London in 1890.

The appearance of the character Dagny in this play is considered to have contributed to the revival of the popularity of this name in Norway and in Scandinavia in general, in the second half of the 19th century.

References

Other sources
 James McFarlane, editor (1962). The Oxford Ibsen, Volume II. Oxford University Press.  .
 James McFarlane, editor (1994). The Cambridge Companion to Ibsen. Cambridge University Press. .

External links
  
 The Vikings of Helgeland. translated by William Archer

1857 plays
Fictional Vikings
Plays by Henrik Ibsen
Tragedy plays